Xue Ruihong (born 4 April 1968) is a Chinese speed skater. She competed at the 1992, 1994 and the 1998 Winter Olympics.

References

1968 births
Living people
Chinese female speed skaters
Olympic speed skaters of China
Speed skaters at the 1992 Winter Olympics
Speed skaters at the 1994 Winter Olympics
Speed skaters at the 1998 Winter Olympics
Sportspeople from Qiqihar
Speed skaters at the 1990 Asian Winter Games
Speed skaters at the 1996 Asian Winter Games
Speed skaters at the 1999 Asian Winter Games
Medalists at the 1996 Asian Winter Games
Medalists at the 1999 Asian Winter Games
Asian Games medalists in speed skating
Asian Games gold medalists for China
20th-century Chinese women
21st-century Chinese women